James M. Stewart, Jr. (born April 23, 1957) is an American former professional ice hockey goaltender who played in one National Hockey League game for the Boston Bruins during the 1979–80 NHL season. His lone game game on January 10, 1980 against the St. Louis Blues. He gave up 3 goals in the first 4 minutes and 5 goals in the first period. He was replaced by fellow rookie Marco Baron in the second period and never played in the NHL again.

Stewart played hockey for St. John's High School and College of the Holy Cross.

Career statistics

Regular season and playoffs

See also
List of players who played only one game in the NHL

External links
 

1957 births
Living people
American men's ice hockey goaltenders
Baltimore Skipjacks (ACHL) players
Binghamton Dusters players
Binghamton Whalers players
Boston Bruins players
Cape Cod Buccaneers players
Ice hockey players from Massachusetts
Indianapolis Checkers (CHL) players
Nashville South Stars players
Saginaw Gears players
Sportspeople from Cambridge, Massachusetts
Springfield Indians players
Undrafted National Hockey League players